This is a list of NUTS2 statistical regions of Portugal by Human Development Index as of 2021.

References 

Portugal
Portugal
Human Development Index
Regions by Human Development Index